Shlomtzion may refer to:
 Shlomtzion (political party), a defunct political party in Israel founded by Ariel Sharon
 Queen Salome Alexandra of Judea
 Shlomtzion (centre), a regional centre in the Jordan Valley
 Shlomzion (jewelry),Unique Jewelry art by shlomzion meitar

Hebrew words and phrases